Kilgard is a neighbourhood of Abbotsford, British Columbia, Canada, located a few kilometres east of that city's core, on the north side of the Trans-Canada Highway at the foot of Sumas Mountain.
  The community and its name are connected with a former brickworks at the site, which produced a good quality fire brick; it was a sister community to Clayburn, which is nearby on the northwest side of Sumas Mountain, which also had a clay mine and brickworks.  The Upper Sumas 6 Indian reserve of the Sumas First Nation is located at Kilgard.

See also
List of communities in British Columbia

References

Neighbourhoods in Abbotsford, British Columbia
Unincorporated settlements in British Columbia
Mining communities in British Columbia